Patersonia maxwellii is a species of flowering plant in the iris family Iridaceae and is endemic to the south of Western Australia. It is a tufted, rhizome-forming perennial herb with linear leaves and violet tepals.

Description

Taxonomy
This species was first formally described in 1869 by Ferdinand von Mueller who gave it the name Genosiris maxwellii in Fragmenta Phytographiae Australiae from specimens collected by George Maxwell from Stokes's Inlet to McCallum's Inlet. In 1873, George Bentham changed the name to Patersonia maxwellii. The specific epithet (maxwellii) commemorates George Maxwell.

Distribution and habitat
Patersonia maxwellii grows in heath and seasonally wet places in near-coastal areas between Albany and Israelite Bay and on the southern Darling Range in the Jarrah Forest and Esperance Plains biogeographic regions in southern Western Australia.

Conservation status
This patersonia is listed as "not threatened" by the Government of Western Australia Department of Biodiversity, Conservation and Attractions.

References

maxwellii
Angiosperms of Western Australia
Asparagales of Australia
Taxa named by Ferdinand von Mueller
Plants described in 1869